Metasia is a genus of moths of the family Crambidae.

Species

Metasia acharis Meyrick, 1889
Metasia achroa (Lower, 1903)
Metasia albicostalis Hampson, 1900
Metasia albula Hampson, 1899
Metasia alvandalis Amsel, 1961
Metasia angustipennis Rothschild, 1921
Metasia annuliferalis Hampson, 1903
Metasia aphrarcha (Meyrick, 1887)
Metasia arenbergeri Slamka, 2013
Metasia arida Hampson, 1913
Metasia asymmetrica Amsel, 1970
Metasia ateloxantha (Meyrick, 1887)
Metasia belutschistanalis Amsel, 1961
Metasia bilineatella Inoue, 1996
Metasia capnochroa (Meyrick, 1884)
Metasia carnealis (Treitschke, 1829)
Metasia celaenophaes (Turner, 1913)
Metasia chionostigma J. F. G. Clarke, 1971
Metasia comealis Amsel, 1961
Metasia corsicalis (Duponchel, 1833)
Metasia criophora Hampson, 1899
Metasia cuencalis Ragonot, 1894
Metasia cyrnealis Schawerda, 1926
Metasia delotypa (Turner, 1913)
Metasia dicealis (Walker, 1859)
Metasia ectodontalis Lower, 1903
Metasia empelioptera J. F. G. Clarke, 1971
Metasia eremialis Hampson, 1913
Metasia exculta Meyrick, 1934
Metasia familiaris (Meyrick, 1884)
Metasia farsalis Amsel, 1961
Metasia gigantalis Staudinger, 1871
Metasia gnorisma J. F. G. Clarke, 1971
Metasia grootbergensis Mey, 2011
Metasia harmodia (Meyrick, 1887)
Metasia hemicirca (Meyrick, 1887)
Metasia hilarodes Meyrick, 1894
Metasia hodiusalis (Walker, 1859)
Metasia homogama (Meyrick, 1887)
Metasia homophaea (Meyrick, 1885)
Metasia hymenalis Guenée, 1854
Metasia ibericalis Ragonot, 1894
Metasia inustalis Ragonot, 1894
Metasia kasyi Amsel, 1970
Metasia kurdistanalis Amsel, 1961
Metasia laristanalis Amsel, 1961
Metasia liophaea (Meyrick, 1887)
Metasia masculina (Strand, 1918)
Metasia mimicralis Amsel, 1970
Metasia minimalis Amsel, 1970
Metasia morbidalis Leech & South, 1901
Metasia mzabi Rothschild, 1913
Metasia ochrochoa (Meyrick, 1887)
Metasia octogenalis Lederer, 1863
Metasia ophialis (Treitschke, 1829)
Metasia orphnopis Turner, 1915
Metasia ossealis Staudinger, 1879
Metasia paganalis South in Leech & South, 1901
Metasia pagmanalis Amsel, 1961
Metasia parallelalis Rothschild, 1921
Metasia parvalis Caradja, 1916
Metasia perfervidalis (Hampson, 1913)
Metasia perirrorata Hampson, 1913
Metasia pharisalis (Walker, 1859)
Metasia phragmatias Lower, 1903
Metasia polytima Turner, 1908
Metasia profanalis (Walker, 1866)
Metasia punctimarginalis Hampson, 1913
Metasia rebeli Slamka, 2013
Metasia rosealis Ragonot, 1895
Metasia roseocilialis Hampson, 1918
Metasia sabulosalis Warren, 1896
Metasia sefidalis Amsel, 1961
Metasia sinuifera Hampson, 1913
Metasia spilocrossa (Turner, 1913)
Metasia straminealis Hampson, 1903
Metasia strangalota (Meyrick, 1887)
Metasia subtilialis Caradja, 1916
Metasia suppandalis (Hübner, 1823)
Metasia tiasalis (Walker, 1859)
Metasia triplex (Turner, 1913)
Metasia tumidalis Hampson, 1913
Metasia typhodes Turner, 1908
Metasia vicanalis South in Leech & South, 1901
Metasia virginalis Ragonot, 1894
Metasia xenogama (Meyrick, 1884)
Metasia zinckenialis Hampson, 1899
Metasia zophophanes (Turner, 1937)

Former species
Metasia continualis Amsel, 1961
Metasia cypriusalis Amsel, 1958
Metasia holoxanthia Hampson, 1899
Metasia olbienalis Guenée, 1854
Metasia oranalis Caradja, 1916
Metasia prionogramma (Meyrick, 1886) 
Metasia pseudocontinualis Amsel, 1961
Metasia rubricalis Rebel, 1939
Metasia younesalis Chrétien, 1915

References 

Natural History Museum Lepidoptera genus database

 
Spilomelinae
Crambidae genera
Taxa named by Achille Guenée